The 2021 Quaker State 400 was a NASCAR Cup Series race held on July 11, 2021, at Atlanta Motor Speedway in Hampton, Georgia. Contested over 260 laps on the 1.54-mile-long (2.48 km) asphalt quad-oval intermediate speedway, it was the 21st race of the 2021 NASCAR Cup Series season.

Report

Background

Atlanta Motor Speedway (formerly Atlanta International Raceway) is a track in Hampton, Georgia, 20 miles (32 km) south of Atlanta. It is a  quad-oval track with a seating capacity of 111,000. It opened in 1960 as a  standard oval. In 1994, 46 condominiums were built over the northeastern side of the track. In 1997, to standardize the track with Speedway Motorsports' other two  ovals, the entire track was almost completely rebuilt. The frontstretch and backstretch were swapped, and the configuration of the track was changed from oval to quad-oval. The project made the track one of the fastest on the NASCAR circuit.

Entry list
 (R) denotes rookie driver.
 (i) denotes driver who are ineligible for series driver points.

Qualifying
Chase Elliott was awarded the pole for the race as determined by competition-based formula.

Starting Lineup

Race

Chase Elliott was awarded the pole. Ricky Stenhouse Jr. spun into the wall and collected Daniel Suárez. Kyle Busch won the first stage while Kurt Busch won the second stage. The race went under a red flag for 20 minutes to repair damage to the track surface. Kurt and Kyle traded the lead with lapped traffic causing problems. After Kyle got into the wall, Kurt was able to pull away and win the race.

Stage Results

Stage One
Laps: 80

Stage Two
Laps: 80

Final Stage Results

Stage Three
Laps: 100

Race statistics
 Lead changes: 10 among 7 different drivers
 Cautions/Laps: 4 for 21
 Red flags: 1 for 19 minutes and 4 seconds
 Time of race: 2 hours, 50 minutes and 8 seconds
 Average speed:

Media

Television
NBC Sports covered the race on the television side. Rick Allen, Jeff Burton, Steve Letarte and 2004 Atlanta winner Dale Earnhardt Jr. called the race from the broadcast booth. Dave Burns, Marty Snider and Dillon Welch handled the pit road duties from pit lane. Rutledge Wood handled the features from the track.

Radio
The race was broadcast on radio by the Performance Racing Network and simulcast on Sirius XM NASCAR Radio. Doug Rice and Mark Garrow called the race from the booth when the field raced down the front stretch. Rob Albright called the race from atop a billboard outside of turn 2 when the field raced through turns 1 and 2 & Brad Gillie called the race from a billboard outside of turn 3 when the field raced through turns 3 and 4. On pit road, PRN was manned by Alan Cavanna, Brett McMillan and Doug Turnbull.

Standings after the race

Drivers' Championship standings

Manufacturers' Championship standings

Note: Only the first 16 positions are included for the driver standings.
. – Driver has clinched a position in the NASCAR Cup Series playoffs.

References

2021 in sports in Georgia (U.S. state)
2021 NASCAR Cup Series
Quaker State 400
NASCAR races at Atlanta Motor Speedway